UniteUp! is a Japanese mixed-media project created by Sony Music Entertainment Japan. It started with a YouTube channel created in November 2021, with songs from various artists released in the channel. An anime television series by CloverWorks premiered in January 2023.

Characters

Protostar

Legit

Jaxx/Jaxx

AneLa

Media

Anime
An anime television series by CloverWorks was announced during the Aniplex Online Fest 2022 event on September 24, 2022. The anime is directed by Shin'ichiro Ushijima, with Rino Yamazaki overseeing series scripts, Majiro designing the characters and serving as chief animation director alongside Asami Komatsu and Yurie Hama, and Yuki Hayashi composing the music. It premiered on January 7, 2023, on Tokyo MX and other networks. Crunchyroll licensed the series. Muse Communication licensed the series in Asia-Pacific.

On January 21, it was announced that Episode 4 would be delayed to February 11 due to the COVID-19 pandemic.

References

External links
 Official YouTube channel 
 Project and anime official website 
 

2023 anime television series debuts
Anime postponed due to the COVID-19 pandemic
Aniplex
CloverWorks
Crunchyroll anime
Japanese idols in anime and manga
Muse Communication
Music-related YouTube channels
Sony Music Entertainment Japan
Tokyo MX original programming